Pedenville is an unincorporated community in Pike County, in the U.S. state of Georgia.

History
A post office called Pedenville was established in 1897, and remained in operation until 1905. The community was named after Reverend
A. G. Peden, an early settler.

References

Unincorporated communities in Pike County, Georgia